Miss Fane's Baby Is Stolen is a 1934 pre-Code American comedy-drama film, starring Dorothea Wieck, Alice Brady, and Baby LeRoy, written by Adela Rogers St. Johns and Jane Storm from a novel and story by Rupert Hughes, and directed by Alexander Hall. The events depicted in the film were allegedly based on the Lindbergh kidnapping.

Plot summary
Despite the dramatic story elements of child kidnapping, the overall tone of the film mixes comedy and drama. Madeline Fane (Wieck) is a busy and successful actress who is fiercely devoted to her two-year-old son. One day, little Michael disappears from his crib. Miss Fane avoids speaking to the police at first, then calls upon both law enforcement and her legions of fans for help. One of them, impoverished Molly Prentiss (Brady) who is also a single mother and who receives a signed photo of her idol at the beginning of the film after watching Fane finish a take with her leading man, comes to the rescue.

Cast
 Dorothea Wieck as Miss Madeline Fane
 Alice Brady as Molly Prentiss
 Baby LeRoy as Michael Fane
 William Frawley as Captain Murphy
 George Barbier as MacCready
 Alan Hale, Sr. as Sam
 Jack LaRue as Bert
 Dorothy Burgess as Dotty
 Florence Roberts as Agnes
 Irving Bacon as Joel Prentiss
 Ruth Clifford as Friend of Miss Fane (uncredited)
 George 'Spanky' McFarland as Johnny Prentiss

Production
This is one of only a handful of English-language roles for Swiss-German actress Dorothea Wieck, who was assigned to the project after Carole Lombard declined the role. In the opening 'film-within-a-film' sequence, many of the film's crew members can be seen playing crew members of Miss Fane's film, including director Alexander Hall and cinematographer Alfred Gilks. Screenwriter Adela Rogers St. Johns had covered the Lindbergh case, which was still a fresh news item when Miss Fane's Baby Is Missing went into production, and was not yet resolved when the film was released. Unlike the real case, Michael Fane is recovered safely and unharmed, in compliance with the Hays Office.

Reception
Miss Fane's Baby Is Stolen opened to positive reviews. Mordaunt Hall of the New York Times enthusiastically called the film "extraordinarily effective," and singled out for praise its leading lady: "Miss Wieck's interpretation of mental agony is subdued but very true. Her expression of joy at the return of Michael is apt to bring tears to the eyes of the most hardened cinema-goer..." Time magazine called it "a topical film which draws tears with out half trying" in a dual review with I Am Suzanne! (1933), and noted the "expert work" of cast members Brady and Jack La Rue.

References

External links

1934 films
1934 comedy-drama films
American comedy-drama films
American black-and-white films
Paramount Pictures films
Films directed by Alexander Hall
Films based on works by Rupert Hughes
1930s English-language films
1930s American films